Gevherhan Sultan ("Gem of the Khan";  1605 or 1608 – died 1660) was an Ottoman princess, daughter of Sultan Ahmed I (reign 1603–1617) and Kösem Sultan, half-sister of Sultan Osman II (reign 1618–1622), and sister of Sultans Murad IV (1623–1640) and Ibrahim (reign 1640–1648) of the Ottoman Empire.

Birth
Ahmed named his daughter in honor of his great aunt Gevherhan Sultan, who had introduced his mother Handan Sultan to his father Mehmed III.

Her mother was Kösem Sultan, Haseki of Ahmed, but some times she is considered Mahfiruz's second child and full sister of Osman II.

First marriage
In the summer of 1612, five year old Gevherhan was married, as arranged by Ahmed, to Öküz Kara Mehmed Pasha, who served as the governor of Egypt from 1607 to 1611, and Grand Admiral of the Ottoman fleet in 1611. The wedding took place at the Old Palace, and the couple were given the Palace of Ibrahim Pasha as their residence. Mehmed served as Grand Vizier from 1614 until 1616 under Ahmed, and then again for a few months in 1619 under Osman II. After being dismissed from the office a second time, he died in Aleppo in around 1621. With him, Gevherhan had a son who name is unknown and who died in infancy, born in 1621/1622.

Second marriage
Gevherhan, later in the reign of her brother, Osman II, married Topal Recep Pasha, who in 1632 served as Grand Vizier under her brother Murad IV. With Recep Pasha, she had a daughter named Safiye Hanımsultan (January 1630 – 1682),  who in turn married the future Grand Vizier Abaza Siyavuş Pasha.

In popular culture

 In the 2015 TV series Muhteşem Yüzyıl: Kösem, Gevherhan is portrayed by Turkish actresses Çağla Naz Kargı and Asli Tandoğan as a child and adult respectively. In the series, her marriages and children do not match historical ones.

See also
Ottoman dynasty
Ottoman family tree
Ottoman Emperors family tree (simplified)
 List of Ottoman Princesses

References

Sources
 
 
 
 

17th-century Ottoman princesses